Filton Bank is the name given to a  section of the Bristol to Birmingham line in Bristol, England, roughly between  and  stations.

Description
The line runs from Dr Days Junction where the Great Western Main Line branches off from the Bristol to Birmingham line just south of Lawrence Hill station, to Filton Junction just north of Filton Abbey Wood station where the South Wales Main Line branches off. The Severn Beach line branches off at Narroways Hill Junction. The  line has recently (autumn 2018) been returned to quadruple track for its full length.

History
The line was built by the Bristol and South Wales Union Railway. It was four-tracked until 1984 when it was reduced to double track, with the running lines slewed over to increase line speeds. In late 2018 it was returned to four-track.

Reinstatement

It was announced in July 2012 that Filton Bank would be returned to a four-track layout. This has restored the separation between fast, main line services and stopping, relief line services, increasing capacity on the line. A fourth platform has been built at Filton Abbey Wood station. It will allow services on the Severn Beach line to be increased to twice hourly, and the introduction of a twice hourly London Paddington to Bristol Temple Meads via Bristol Parkway service. The additional tracks were opened on 19 November 2018 with work scheduled to finish in 2019.

The line was to have been electrified as part of the Great Western Main Line electrification scheme. In November 2016 it was announced that electrification on this section of line had been deferred due to cost overruns.

See also
Rail transport in Bristol
MetroWest
Friends of Suburban Bristol Railways

References

Railway inclines in the United Kingdom
Rail transport in Bristol
Railway lines in South West England